Anti-nuclear protests in the United States have occurred since the development of nuclear power plants in the United States. Examples include Clamshell Alliance protests at Seabrook Station Nuclear Power Plant, Abalone Alliance protests at Diablo Canyon Power Plant, and those following the Three Mile Island accident in  1979.

See also
 Anti-nuclear groups in the United States
 List of articles associated with nuclear issues in California
 List of books about nuclear issues
 Nuclear power in the United States
 Uranium mining and the Navajo people
 List of cancelled nuclear reactors in the United States
 Civil disobedience
 Helen Caldicott
 Paxus Calta
 Harvey Wasserman
 Cayuga Lake
 Environmental racism

References

Bibliography

 Brown, Jerry and Rinaldo Brutoco (1997). Profiles in Power: The Anti-nuclear Movement and the Dawn of the Solar Age, Twayne Publishers.
 Cragin, Susan (2007). Nuclear Nebraska: The Remarkable Story of the Little County That Couldn’t Be Bought, AMACOM.
 Dickerson, Carrie B. and Patricia Lemon (1995). Black Fox: Aunt Carrie's War Against the Black Fox Nuclear Power Plant, Council Oak Publishing Company, 
 Fradkin, Philip L. (2004). Fallout: An American Nuclear Tragedy, University of Arizona Press.
 Giugni, Marco (2004). Social Protest and Policy Change: Ecology, Antinuclear, and Peace Movements in Comparative Perspective, Rowman and Littlefield.
 Jasper, James M. (1997). The Art of Moral Protest: Culture, Biography, and Creativity in Social Movements, University of Chicago Press, 
 Lovins, Amory B. and Price, John H. (1975). Non-Nuclear Futures: The Case for an Ethical Energy Strategy, Ballinger Publishing Company, 1975, 
 McCafferty, David P. (1991). The Politics of Nuclear Power: A History of the Shoreham Power Plant, Kluwer.
 Miller, Byron A. (2000). Geography and Social Movements: Comparing Anti-nuclear Activism in the Boston area, University of Minnesota Press.
 Natti, Susanna and Acker, Bonnie (1979). No Nukes: Everyone's Guide to Nuclear Power, South End Press.
 Ondaatje, Elizabeth H. (c1988). Trends in Antinuclear Protests in the United States, 1984–1987, Rand Corporation.
 Peterson, Christian (2003). Ronald Reagan and Antinuclear Movements in the United States and Western Europe, 1981–1987, Edwin Mellen Press.
 Polletta, Francesca (2002). Freedom Is an Endless Meeting: Democracy in American Social Movements, University of Chicago Press, 
 Price, Jerome (1982). The Antinuclear Movement, Twayne Publishers.
 Smith, Jennifer  (Editor), (2002). The Antinuclear Movement, Cengage Gale.
 Surbrug, Robert (2009). Beyond Vietnam: The Politics of Protest in Massachusetts, 1974–1990, University of Massachusetts Press.
 Walker, J. Samuel (2004). Three Mile Island: A Nuclear Crisis in Historical Perspective, University of California Press.
 Wellock, Thomas R. (1998). Critical Masses: Opposition to Nuclear Power in California, 1958–1978, University of Wisconsin Press, 
 Wills, John (2006). Conservation Fallout: Nuclear Protest at Diablo Canyon, University of Nevada Press.

 
 

Nuclear energy in the United States
Nuclear history of the United States
Environmentalism in the United States
Protests in the United States

}